Patrick Harold Falkiner Barron, also called Paddy, (13 November 1911 – 27 August 1991) was the fourth Bishop of George.

Barron was educated at Leeds University and (after studies at the  College of the Resurrection, Mirfield) ordained in  1939. He began his ordained ministry a curate at Our Most Holy Redeemer, Clerkenwell after which he was a chaplain to the South African Army during World War II. After the war he held incumbencies at Zeerust, Potchefstroom and Blyvooruitzicht. Later he was Archdeacon of Germiston, then Dean of Johannesburg. In 1964 he was ordained to the episcopate as Suffragan Bishop of Cape Town and two years later was translated to George.

References

1911 births
Alumni of the University of Leeds
Alumni of the College of the Resurrection
Anglican archdeacons in Africa
20th-century Anglican Church of Southern Africa bishops
Anglican bishops of George
1991 deaths
South African military chaplains
World War II chaplains
Deans of Johannesburg